Events from the year 1976 in Denmark.

Incumbents
 Monarch – Margrethe II
 Prime minister – Anker Jørgensen

Events

Sports
 6–7 April — With two gold medals and three silver medals, Denmark finishes as the second best nation at the 5th European Badminton Championships in Dublin, Ireland.

Date unknown
 Graeme Gilmore (AUS) and Dieter Kemper (FRG) win the Six Days of Copenhagen sox-day track cycling race.

Births
25 April – Kenneth Cortsen, sport management researcher
26 June – Janus Friis, entrepreneur, co-founder of skype
28 July – Rasmus Bjerg, actor, comedian
29 August – Jon Dahl Tomasson, football player
13 October – Cathrine Grage, speedskater, inline skater, and cyclist
14 December – Peter Gade, badminton player

Deaths
 12 May – Kaj Gottlob, architect (born 1887)
 29 December  Ingeborg Frederiksen, illustrator (born 1896)

See also
1976 in Danish television

References

 
Denmark
Years of the 20th century in Denmark
1970s in Denmark